Kiralık Aşk (Love for Rent) is a Turkish romantic drama television series, starring Barış Arduç, Elçin Sangu, Salih Bademci, Sinem Öztürk, Nergis Kumbasar, and Levent Ülgen. It comprises two seasons, premiering on Star TV on June 19, 2015 with the final episode airing January 20, 2017.

Plot

A waitress named Defne Topal (Elçin Sangu) finds herself in a love game when she urgently needs  a large sum of money to pay off her brother's debt. Defne looks after her grandmother, her young sister and her older brother. Her father died when Defne and her siblings were very young after which their mother left to start life anew with another man. One day, a man named Ömer İplikçi (Barış Arduç) kisses her abruptly outside the restaurant where Defne works to save himself from a blind date arranged by his aunt. Unknown to Defne and Ömer, Ömer's aunt, Neriman (Nergis Kumbasar), witnesses the kiss. After that, Neriman approaches Defne with an offer to marry and then leave the man she's renting her for, her husband's nephew Ömer. Neriman is ready to give 400,000 liras, but Defne only takes the money she needs (200,000 liras) and accepts the offer to free her brother from the people he is indebted to.

Neriman is desperate to find a girl for Ömer in order to please her father-in-law and Ömer's estranged grandfather, Hulusi İplikçi (Ferdi Merter). Hulusi has threatened Neriman and her husband Necmi (Levent Ülgen) that unless he sees Ömer married in the next 6 months, he will sell all the family property including Necmi and Neriman's house. Under Neriman's instructions, Defne begins work at Ömer İplikçi's footwear company as his personal assistant, unaware of the fact that he is the man who had forcefully kissed her until she sees him on her first day of work. She has 6 months to make Ömer fall in love with her, marry him and then leave him. Things become complicated when, without intending to, Defne also falls in love with Ömer, now torn between not wanting to deceive him and hiding the true reason she came into his life for fear that he will never want to see her again.

Cast 
 Barış Arduç as Ömer İplikçi
 Elçin Sangu as Defne Topal
 Salih Bademci as Sinan Karakaya
 Onur Büyüktopçu as Koray Sargın
 Müjde Uzman - Seda Berensel
 Seçkin Özdemir - Pamir Marden
 Sinem Öztürk as Yasemin Kayalar                                   
 Nergis Kumbasar as Neriman İplikçi
 Melisa Şenolsun as Sude İplikçi
 Levent Ülgen as Necmi İplikçi
 Ferdi Merter as Hulusi İplikçi
 Ayberk Atilla as Sadri Usta
 Devrim Yalçın as Deniz Tranba 
 Elifcan Ongurlar as Fikret Gallo 
 Ismail Karagöz as Şükrü
 Hande Ağaoğlu as Mine
 Hikmet Körmükçü as Türkan Topal
 Melisa Giz Cengiz as Esra Topal
Kerem Fırtına as İsmail
 Sanem Yeles as Nihan Topal
 Osman Akça as Serdar Topal
 Ragıp Gülen as Zübeyir Taşçalan
 Selin Uzal as Derya
 Simge Doğanlar as Ece
 Leyla Lydia Tuğutlu as İz 
 Özlem Gezgin as Nazlıcan 
 Ender Sakallı as Vedat .
 Bariş Murat Yagci as Eymen
 Natiq M. Dhahir as abo Alhawashim

Episodes

References

External links 
  
 

2015 Turkish television series debuts
2017 Turkish television series endings
Turkish drama television series
2010s romantic comedy television series
Star TV (Turkey) original programming